Shomari Salum Kapombe (born 28 January 1992) is a Tanzanian footballer who plays for Simba and the Tanzania national team. He previously played for Tanzanian Premier League side Simba and French National 2 side Cannes.

Kapombe appeared for Tanzania at the 2014 World Cup qualifiers.

International career

International goals
Scores and results list Tanzania's goal tally first.

Honours
 Tanzanian Premier League: 2011–12 2017-2018, 2018-2019, 2019-2020, 2020-2021.

 FAT CUP:
2019-2020, 2020-2021.

 COMMUNITY SHIELD
2011, 2012, 2017, 2018, 2019, 2020.

References

1992 births
Living people
People from Morogoro Region
Association football defenders
Tanzanian footballers
Tanzania international footballers
Tanzanian expatriate footballers
Expatriate footballers in France
AS Cannes players
Tanzanian expatriate sportspeople in France
Simba S.C. players
Azam F.C. players
Tanzanian Premier League players
Tanzania A' international footballers
2020 African Nations Championship players